Jerónimo Manrique de Lara may refer to:
Jerónimo Manrique de Lara (bishop of Ávila) (1538–1595), Spanish Roman Catholic bishop and inquisitor
Jerónimo Manrique de Lara (bishop of Salamanca) (1530–1593), Spanish Roman Catholic bishop
Jerónimo Manrique de Lara y de Herrera (1581–1644), Spanish Roman Catholic bishop